Suzannah Elizabeth Powell (born August 16, 1988) is an American singer, songwriter, producer, rapper, and performance artist, best known by her stage name Boyfriend. Raised in Nashville, she found her persona upon moving to New Orleans. Boyfriend coined the term "rap-cabaret," a nod to the emphasis on performance in her music.
 
Formerly known as Flannery Mitchell, she identifies only as Boyfriend but was born Suzannah Powell, daughter of Award-winning Country songwriter and producer Monty Powell.

Early life and education
Boyfriend grew up in Nashville, Tennessee. She was raised in the Church of Christ and attended parochial school from kindergarten through her sophomore year of high school. In a 2015 interview, she said that her early environment forced her to develop a sense of self. "My personal reality growing up was very much conservative, hetero-normative, white, and Christian. So to do something like be vegetarian, or like girls, or explore another culture or, god forbid, question god... you had to grapple, have a mental reckoning."

After graduating from a public high school in downtown Nashville, Boyfriend moved to Los Angeles, where she attended the University of California, Los Angeles. She graduated with a degree in creative writing.

Following her graduation, Boyfriend remained in Los Angeles, where she worked in television production. After five years, she decided to return to the South, where she took an arts education job in New Orleans. Working a day job as a teacher, she began to develop the character of Boyfriend after she discovered a natural ability to rap while drunkenly freestyle rapping with friends. She was drawn to rap by the amount of words she could use in a song.

Style and identity
Described as a "mile-a-minute rhyme-spitter; a bawdy, brassy performance artist and a feminist provocateur," her rhymes address subjects including sex, feminism, gender and empowerment with 'bracingly blue, carefully crafted, comic turns of phrase." She has said that she uses rap as social commentary, and as a way to start conversations about art and identity.

She chose the stage name Boyfriend both because she wanted a name that evoked a feeling from everyone that heard it, and because she felt the overuse of the term among her friends was unintentionally oppressive.

Boyfriend can easily be identified by her signature large glasses, vintage lingerie, and a head full of curlers during most performances and appearances. It is not uncommon to spot fans at her rap cabaret shows dressed as Boyfriend.

In January 2015, Boyfriend told an interviewer that there was "definitely repression being cast off—I certainly hope that there's someone out there who hears my music and feels less ashamed, less scared, and less dirty as a result. But it's not about shock value so much as embracing the darkness … employing darkness as a tool for light."

Career
2012–2013

The first track she recorded was the overtly-sexual "Hunch and Munch." It was accompanied by a video, released in February 2012.

With a mantra of "form and intention," she put together a Burlesque-inspired live show. Categorizing her performances as "rap cabaret," she appeared as Boyfriend for the first time opening for bounce artist Vockah Redu at a New Orleans club. Gambit wrote that Boyfriend has a "stage show that is as much cone-bra, arena-sized Madonna as it is an intimate, hilariously profane psychosexual bedroom drama."

2014–2016

Working with the New Orleans-based production team/party duo Sex Party, she released a series of songs about love through her Love Your Boyfriend project. Two EPs, Love Your Boyfriend Part 1 and Love Your Boyfriend Part 2 were released in late 2014. Love Your Boyfriend Part 3 was scheduled to be released in 2016.

In addition to touring as a headliner, Boyfriend performed at events including SXSW, Fun Fun Fun Fest, Pemberton Music Festival, and BUKU Music + Art Project. She toured with Big Freedia during the fall of 2015.

Boyfriend collaborated with Big Freedia on "Marie Antoinette," a "big room banger" which premiered on The Fader in August 2016. She also wrote 4 songs and co-produced Big Freedia's December 2016 EP, A Very Big Freedia Christmazz.

2017–present

In spring of 2017, Boyfriend released Next, an EP produced in Laurel Canyon with the help of New Orleans musicians Khris Royal, Joe Shirley, and Alvin Ford Jr. The EP includes a track featuring Cindy Wilson of the B-52's.

In June 2017, "Boyfriend and her dancers slayed...with a dazzling dance routine" at Bonnaroo Music Festival where her performance with Preservation Hall Jazz Band and Chance The Rapper in the SuperJam was named by Consequence of Sound as the Number 3 set in their Bonnaroo Festival Review: Top 10 Sets. Additionally, Boyfriend was mentioned in Bob Lefsetz' June 12, 2017 edition of The Lefsetz Letter as Bonnaroo's Best Find.

Boyfriend performed at Outside Lands Music and Arts Festival in August 2017 where her performance was mentioned by Rolling Stone as a part of their 5 Best Things That Happened at Outside Lands 2017.In December 2017, Boyfriend flew to Tokyo,Japan to headline a party for iconic fashion designer Marc Jacobs at the notorious Ai Honten host club in Kabukicho's Red Light District. The event was held to celebrate the launch of his Spring/Summer 2018 Collection and guests included Yu Yamada and Kiko Mizuhara among other celebrities and influencers.

In November 2018, Boyfriend released "Wash That", her take on the Rodgers and Hammerstein classic, "I'm Gonna Wash That Man Right Outa My Hair" from their musical South Pacific. Premiered by Playbill, the song explores "beauty rituals and hair maintenance" which are some of Boyfriend's favorite themes to explore. She tells Playbill that "Wash That" is "in perfect alignment with my ongoing thesis statement about the burden of beautification and the processes we undergo as women to be deemed 'presentable,'" she explains. "So often it's the opposite, where we're plucking and tweezing in order to snag a man, but this taps into the empowerment that is nested inside all of these rituals—wash him off! Put that lipstick on for you!"

Musical theaterHag.Boyfriend is also the creator of a three-act semi-scripted and interactive musical that takes place at Preservation Hall. In 2018, she produced the third annual production where audience members experienced a sold-out experience that featured the dynamic burlesque/drag duo of Kitten & Lou, rearranged Boyfriend ragtime mixes by composer Joe Shirley and trombone stylings by Preservation Hall's David L. Harris.

Controversy
In April 2016, a Boyfriend performance at Proud Larry's in Oxford, Mississippi, was cancelled "due to statewide pressures and the current political climate."

In March 2018, Boyfriend was criticized for performing a series of shows in San Francisco of which tickets were sold exclusively on the Airbnb Experiences platform. She was criticized on social media platforms by critics of the home-sharing app who felt her decision supported gentrification and home displacement.

DiscographyLike My Hand Did (Single) (2014)Love Your Boyfriend, Part 1 (2014)Love Your Boyfriend, Part 2 (2014)Love Your Boyfriend, Part 3 (2016)Marie Antoinette (feat. Big Freedia) (Single) (2016)Fun Sh*t (feat. Cindy Wilson of The B52s) (Single) (2017)NEXT (EP) (2017)Toast (Single) (2018)DBLSPK with Serpentine Man (Single) (2018)Wash That (Single) (2018)Toast (Remix) (feat. Maty Noyes)(Single) (2018)You're a Mean One, Mr. Grinch (with Preservation Hall Jazz Band) (Promotional single) (2019)Sugar & Spice (2022)

Selected videographyHunch and Munch (2013)Swanky (2014)Attention (2014)Like My Hand Did (2014)Jealousy (2015)Rap Cabaret - Say You Will (Boogie T. Remix)'' (2016)

References

External links
 

American performance artists
American women singers
Pansexual musicians
American rappers
Feminist rappers
Feminist musicians
University of California, Los Angeles alumni
1988 births
Musicians from Nashville, Tennessee
Living people
21st-century American rappers
21st-century American women musicians
21st-century American LGBT people
LGBT people from Tennessee
LGBT rappers
21st-century women rappers